Reginald O'Keith Rogers (January 21, 1964 – October 24, 2013) was a professional American football defensive tackle who played four seasons in the National Football League for the Detroit Lions (1987–1988), Buffalo Bills (1991), and Tampa Bay Buccaneers (1992).

A consensus All-American at the University of Washington in Seattle under head coach Don James, Rogers was chosen seventh overall in the 1987 NFL Draft by the Lions. However, he only played six games of his rookie season due to a slew of emotional problems, even spending time in a counseling center.  His second season in 1988 ended after only five games when his car struck another vehicle and killed three teenagers early on Thursday, October 20. He was later found to have a blood alcohol content of 0.15, the legal limit in Michigan being 0.10 at the time.  The Lions waived him in July 1989, not because of the felony charges, but because he broke his neck in the collision.  In 1990, he was convicted of vehicular homicide and spent 13 months in prison.

Following his sentence, Rogers had brief stints with Buffalo and Tampa Bay, but was out the NFL after the  season. He made his way to the Canadian Football League and played for the Hamilton Tiger-Cats (1993–94) and one of the U.S. expansion teams, the Shreveport Pirates (1995). He played 33 games in the CFL and accumulated 18 sacks and 91 tackles in three-down football.

Rogers is often considered among the biggest draft busts in NFL history.  In 2008, ESPN named him the 13th-biggest bust since the AFL-NFL merger.  A year earlier, Yahoo! Sports named him the worst #7 pick since the merger.

On November 26, 2008, Rogers was involved in a hit-and-run collision in Tukwila that resulted in his arrest and a charge of DUI. It was his fifth arrest for DUI in the state of Washington, dating back to his college days at UW.

Rogers also played three seasons for the Husky basketball team under head coach Marv Harshman.

Personal
Rogers had six children; twins Reggie & Regina, Amanda, Brittany, Isiah, and Jackie. His eldest daughter Brittany died from an enlarged heart.

Reggie’s daughter,
Regina Rogers-Wright attended UCLA and University of Washington and was an All American and 2012 WNBA draft nominee. Regina, lead the nation in field goal percentage her senior year at the University of Washington with 57%. Regina, recently had her jersey retired at Chief Sealth International School in 2020.  
On December 15, 2019 Reggie’s first grandchild Zuri was born from his daughter Amanda.
He was the younger brother of Cleveland Browns safety Don Rogers, who died of cocaine poisoning at age 23 in June 1986.

Death
At age 49, Rogers was found dead at his home in Seattle in 2013. An autopsy revealed that he died of combined cocaine and alcohol intoxication.

See also
 Washington Huskies football statistical leaders

References

External links
Sports Press Northwest – Ex-UW star Reggie Rogers: a rolling tragedy
 

1964 births
2013 deaths
African-American basketball players
African-American players of American football
All-American college football players
American football defensive tackles
Basketball players from Sacramento, California
Buffalo Bills players
Detroit Lions players
Players of American football from Sacramento, California
Tampa Bay Buccaneers players
Washington Huskies football players
Washington Huskies men's basketball players
American men's basketball players
20th-century African-American sportspeople
21st-century African-American people